Grego may refer to:

 Grego (surname), a surname
 Grego Anderson (born 1968), American musician
 Joseph Grego (1843 –  1908), British art collector, author, inventor,and journalist, inventor